Fawn Lake is a lake located west of Lake Pleasant, New York. Fish species present in the lake are lake trout, white sucker, black bullhead, smallmouth bass, yellow perch, and pickerel. There is trail access on the southwest shore from Sacandaga Lake. No fishing is allowed between 10/16 and 3/31.

References

Lakes of New York (state)
Lakes of Hamilton County, New York